Estigmenida is a genus of beetles in the family Cerambycidae, containing the following species:

 Estigmenida albolineata Breuning, 1940
 Estigmenida robusta Breuning, 1940
 Estigmenida variabilis Gahan, 1895

References

Apomecynini
Cerambycidae genera